Waupaca County is a county  in the U.S. state of Wisconsin. As of the 2020 census, the population was 51,812. The county seat is Waupaca. The county was created in 1851 and organized in 1853. It is named after the Waupaca River, a Menominee language name meaning 'white sand bottom', 'pale water', or 'tomorrow river'.

History
Ancient indigenous peoples constructed earthworks that expressed their religious and political concepts. An early European explorer counted 72 such earthen mounds in what is now Waupaca County, many of them in the form of effigy mounds, shaped like "humans, turtles, catfish and others." There were 52 mounds constructed around what is now called Taylor Lake. Most mounds were lost to agricultural development. One mound, shaped like a catfish, is still visible in a private yard along County Hwy. QQ, just east of Taylor Lake. The site was marked by a local women's club with a commemorative plaque installed on a large stone.

Under pressure from European-American development, the Menominee people ceded their title to the United States for these lands by treaty in 1852. Following that, the flow of new migrant settlers greatly increased from the East, with people moving from New England, New York, and Ohio. They developed the land primarily for agricultural use in the early decades, also quickly establishing sawmills on the rivers.

In the 1870s railroads were constructed in the county: the Wisconsin Central in 1872 and the Green Bay and Minnesota Railroad (later known as Green Bay, Minnesota & St. Paul) in 1873. These improved the county's connections to markets for its lumber and other products. For a period, entrepreneurs and merchants gained high profits from the lumber industry, establishing many fine homes in the larger cities.

Geography
The water includes 22 lakes that form the Waupaca Chain O' Lakes. These lakes are majority spring fed and connected by the Crystal River outlet. Waupaca County is also home to Partridge Lake on the Wolf River and the Waupaca River.

Major highways

Railroads
Canadian National
Watco

Buses
List of intercity bus stops in Wisconsin

Airports
 KCLI - Clintonville Municipal Airport
 KPCZ - Waupaca Municipal Airport

Adjacent counties
 Shawano County - north
 Outagamie County - east
 Winnebago County - southeast
 Waushara County - southwest
 Portage County - west
 Marathon County - northwest

Demographics

2020 census
As of the census of 2020, the population was 51,812. The racial makeup of the county was 93.2% White, 0.6% Native American, 0.5% Asian, 0.4% Black or African American, 1.6% from other races, and 3.7% from two or more races. Ethnically, the population was 3.6% Hispanic or Latino of any race.

2000 census

As of the census of 2000, there were 51,731 people, 19,863 households, and 13,884 families residing in the county. The racial makeup of the county was 97.93% White, 0.17% Black or African American, 0.42% Native American, 0.27% Asian, 0.01% Pacific Islander, 0.54% from other races, and 0.66% from two or more races. 1.38% of the population were Hispanic or Latino of any race. 53.1% were of German, 8.5% Norwegian and 6.8% Irish ancestry. 96.6% spoke English, 1.4% Spanish and 1.3% German as their first language.

There were 19,863 households, out of which 32.60% had children under the age of 18 living with them, 58.40% were married couples living together, 7.40% had a female householder with no husband present, and 30.10% were non-families. 25.20% of all households were made up of individuals, and 11.70% had someone living alone who was 65 years of age or older. The average household size was 2.51 and the average family size was 3.01.

By age, 25.70% of the population was under 18, 7.10% from 18 to 24, 27.80% from 25 to 44, 22.70% from 45 to 64, and 16.70% who were 65 or older. The median age was 38 years. For every 100 females there were 100.30 males. For every 100 females age 18 and over, there were 98.40 males.

In 2017, there were 505 births, giving a general fertility rate of 63.4 births per 1000 women aged 15–44, the 37th highest rate out of all 72 Wisconsin counties. Of these, 26 of the births occurred at home.

Government

County offices
 County board chairman - Dick Koeppen
 Vice Chair - David Morack
 County clerk - Kristy K. Opperman
 County sheriff - Timothy Wilz

Politics

Waupaca County has long been one of the most Republican counties in Wisconsin. Only two Democrats have carried the county at the presidential level since the formation of the Republican Party – Franklin D. Roosevelt in 1932 and 1936, and Barack Obama in 2008, and in 1936 Roosevelt only won by plurality because of a sizeable vote for Union Party nominee William Lemke. It was one of only three Wisconsin counties, alongside Walworth and Waushara, to vote for Barry Goldwater over Lyndon Johnson in 1964.

In other statewide races, the county is equally Republican. The only Democratic gubernatorial candidate it has backed since at least 1908 is Albert Schmedeman in 1932. Senators Herb Kohl in 2006 and William Proxmire in 1976 and 1970 did carry Waupaca County when they swept every county in the state, but no other Democratic senatorial candidate has won the county since the Seventeenth Amendment.

Communities

Cities
 Clintonville
 Manawa
 Marion (partly in Shawano County)
 New London (partly in Outagamie County)
 Waupaca (county seat)
 Weyauwega

Villages
 Big Falls
 Embarrass
 Fremont
 Iola
 Ogdensburg
 Scandinavia

Towns

 Bear Creek
 Caledonia
 Dayton
 Dupont
 Farmington
 Fremont
 Harrison
 Helvetia
 Iola
 Larrabee
 Lebanon
 Lind
 Little Wolf
 Matteson
 Mukwa
 Royalton
 Scandinavia
 St. Lawrence
 Union
 Waupaca
 Weyauwega
 Wyoming

Census-designated places
 Chain O' Lakes
 King
 Northport

Unincorporated communities

 Baldwins Mill
 Bear Creek Corners
 Buckbee
 Carmel
 Cobb Town
 Evanswood
 Gills Landing
 Hunting (partial)
 Lind Center
 Little Hope
 Nicholson
 Northland
 North Readfield
 Norske
 Ostrander
 Parfreyville
 Readfield
 Red Banks
 Royalton
 Rural
 Shaw Landing
 Sheridan
 Schmidt Corner
 Symco

Ghost towns/neighborhoods
 Granite City
 Granite Quarry
 Hatton
 Little Wolf
 Marble
 Nowell
 Petersville

See also
 National Register of Historic Places listings in Waupaca County, Wisconsin

References

Further reading
 Commemorative Biographical Record of the Upper Wisconsin Counties of Waupaca, Portage, Wood, Marathon, Lincoln, Oneida, Vilas, Langlade and Shawano. Chicago: J. H. Beers, 1895.
 Ware, John M. (ed.). A Standard History of Waupaca County Wisconsin. Chicago: Lewis Publishing Co., 1917.

External links
 Waupaca County
 Waupaca County map from the Wisconsin Department of Transportation
 Waupaca County History and Genealogical Website

 
1853 establishments in Wisconsin
Populated places established in 1853